The following is a summary of Mayo county football team's 2017 season.

Kits

2017 All-Ireland Senior Football Championship

Fixtures

References

Mayo football season
Mayo county football team seasons